The 2022 FIBA Women's Polynesia Basketball Cup was an international basketball tournament contested by national teams of Polynesia sub-zone of FIBA Oceania. The tournament was hosted by Cook Islands, although the tournament was held in Kaitaia, New Zealand. Originally slated to be held from 6 to September 2021, the schedule was pushed further to April 2022 due to COVID-19 pandemic, with the final dates determined to be held on November 1-5.

The competition served as the sub-regional qualification phase for the basketball event of the 2023 Pacific Games in Solomon Islands with two berths allocated in this tournament, which serves as the official qualifier to the FIBA Asia Cup Pre-Qualifiers.

The  successfully defended their title after sweeping all opponents in this single round-robin tournament. Along with second-placer , they will represent Polynesia in the women's basketball tournament of the 2023 Pacific Games.

Teams
The following national teams participated in the competition.

 
 (Host)

Round robin

Final standings

Awards

 All-Star Team:
  Malama Leaupepe
  Terai Sadler
  Malia Nawahine
  Maea Lextreyt
  Lesila Finau

See also
 Basketball at the 2023 Pacific Games

References

FIBA
Women's basketball